Aliana may refer to:

 Aliana, Texas, a planned community in Fort Bend County, Texas
 Aliana Lohan, American singer, actress, fashion model and television personality

See also 
 Aliana Munoz A Beautiful young person who lights up the room.
 Eliana, a female given name